Robin Dillimore is a former New Zealand netball player who played for her country on 32 occasions, including in the 1991 World Netball Championships.

Early life
Robin Dillimore was born on 27 March 1968. Her mother, Valerie Dillimore (née Morgan), had competed in the 1960 Olympic Games in Rome, Italy as a sprinter, at the age of 16, and had won sprint and long-jump events in national championships. Robin's sister, Carlene, competed in the 1990 Commonwealth Games, held in Auckland, New Zealand.

Netball career
Dillimore played netball for the ASB Collegiate team at the ASB Stadium in Auckland. She played in the Goal keeper (GK) and Goal defence (GD) positions and represented New Zealand at Under-21 and Young International levels. She was first selected for the Silver Ferns, the New Zealand national netball team, in 1989 to play against Australia, and in 1990 took part in the Commonwealth Games demonstration match against Australia in Auckland, which was a prelude to netball being included in subsequent Games. In 1991 she was in the team for the 1991 World Netball Championships in Sydney, Australia, when New Zealand was beaten by Australia 53-52 in the final. In 1993 Dillimore won another international silver medal, this time in the World Games, which were held in The Hague, Netherlands.

Later life
Dillimore is Team Lead, Shipping Operations for Zespri International Limited, the organization that markets Kiwifruit from New Zealand. For leisure, she runs marathons.

References

1968 births
Living people
New Zealand netball players
New Zealand international netball players
1991 World Netball Championships players
Netball players at the 1993 World Games